The Asiet Malkia ("Salutation of Kings") is one of the most commonly recited prayers in Mandaeism. In the prayer, the reciter wishes health and victory (asuta u-zakuta ) upon dozens of heavenly and ancestral figures. According to E. S. Drower, it is recited daily by priests and also before all baptisms (masbuta), ritual meals (lofani), and various rites.

The Asiet Malkia is numbered as Prayer 105 in E. S. Drower's version of the Qolasta, which was based on manuscript 53 of the Drower Collection (abbreviated DC 53). Drower's version is shorter than the versions commonly recited by contemporary Mandaean priests.

Prayer
The formula asuta u-zakuta nhuilkun ( "health and victory are yours") is recited dozens of times in the prayer before the names of each uthra or set of uthras, Hayyi Rabbi, some of the prophets, and the reciter himself, almost all of whom are addressed as malka ( "king").

Drower (1937)
Drower's (1937) version lists the following uthras, etc.

The word niṭufta (spelled niṭupta) originally means 'drop' and has sometimes also been translated as 'cloud'. It is also often used as an appellation to refer to the consorts of uthras.

Drower (1959)
Drower's (1959) version, which differs from the version in Drower (1937), lists the following uthras, etc.

See also
Brakha (daily prayer in Mandaeism)
Tabahatan
Rahma (Mandaeism)
Qolasta
Litany of the Saints
Intercession of saints

References

External links
Salutation of Kings (Asiet malkia) recited by Rbai Rafid al-Sabti in the Netherlands
Salutation of Kings (Asiet malkia) recited by Abdullah Khaffagi in Ahvaz in 1960
Salutation of Kings (Asiet malkia) recited at a Parwanaya service held at a mandi in Michigan
Asiet malkia recited in Stockholm, Sweden
Asiet malkia recited in Stockholm, Sweden (part 2)
Asiet malkia recited in Stockholm, Sweden (part 3)

Mandaic words and phrases
Litanies
 
Mandaean prayer